Tiziano Polenghi (born 26 September 1978) is a former Italian professional footballer who played as a defender and current football manager for Inter U17.

External links
 Sassuolo Calcio Official Player Profile

1978 births
Living people
People from Vizzolo Predabissi
Association football defenders
Italian footballers
Serie A players
Serie B players
Serie C players
U.S. Lecce players
U.S. Salernitana 1919 players
A.S.D. Castel di Sangro Calcio players
Santarcangelo Calcio players
A.C. Monza players
A.S. Giana Erminio players
Footballers from Lombardy
Sportspeople from the Metropolitan City of Milan